Pedu Lake (Malay: Tasik Pedu) is a man-made lake located in Padang Terap District, Kedah, Malaysia. It covers an area of 75 km².

See also
 Geography of Malaysia

External Links
MUDA Agricultural Development Authority Official Website

References

Padang Terap District
Reservoirs in Malaysia
Landforms of Kedah
Tourist attractions in Kedah